Mujibur Rehman, is a Right To Information activist, whistle-blower and anti-corruption fighter from the Indian state of Chhattisgarh. He is a state-level General Secretary of the India Against Corruption people's movement. He is notable for exposing a financial scandal by the officials of Coal India in 2006. Where money was collected as donations towards Prime Minister’s Relief Fund for Kargil war and  cyclone from factory workers was siphoned off by company officials. He says that his life was threatened for exposing this.

References

Indian Muslims
Activists from Chhattisgarh
Living people
Right to Information activists
Year of birth missing (living people)